Madeline Held MBE (1944, in Corbridge, Northumberland – 2020, in London) was a British academic in the Faculty of Arts and Human Sciences, London South Bank University. She had been the Director of the LLU+ (formerly the London Language and Literacy Unit). The unit ran the largest professional development centre in the UK, undertaking capacity building for teacher training in further, higher and community education.

Awards and honours
Held was awarded an MBE for services to Adult Basic Skills in the 2006 New Year Honours List.

References

External links
 Obituary posted by Learning Unlimited 21 April 2020

1944 births
2020 deaths
British educational theorists
Academics of London South Bank University
Members of the Order of the British Empire